Manitherionyssus heterotarsus is a species of mite placed in its own family, Manitherionyssidae, in the order Mesostigmata.

References

Mesostigmata
Acari genera